Shovel may refer to:

Shovel, a tool for lifting and moving loose material
Power shovel, a bucket equipped machine, usually electrically powered, used for digging and loading earth or fragmented rock material, the modern equivalent of steam shovels
Steam shovel, a steam-powered excavating machine designed for lifting and moving material such as rock and soil
Intellipedia shovel
The Shovel, Cowley, a Grade II listed public house at Iver Lane, Cowley, London
 Shovel (album)

See also
Sir Cloudesley Shovell (1650 – 1707)
Shovel Knight, a video game created by Yacht Club Games